Ida Johanna Vihuri (born Hildén, 18 August 1882 – 7 September 1929) was a Finnish politician. She was a member of the Parliament of Finland 1922–1929 for the Social Democratic Party of Finland.

Life and career 
Vihuri was born to a peasant's family in Lempäälä. Since the age of 13 she worked at the Finlayson cotton mill in Tampere. After the 1905 general strike, Vihuri joined the local trade union branch and became the leading unionist of the Finlayson mill.

During the 1918 Civil War of Finland, Vihuri served in the Red administration. Vihuri was captured after the Battle of Tampere and given a life in prison, but she was pardoned in 1920. In the 1922 parliamentary election, Vihuri was elected to the Parliament of Finland.

Vihuri died on 7 September 1929 on her way to a party meeting in Kuru as the SS Kuru sank in the lake Näsijärvi. The disaster led to the loss of 136 lives. Vihuri was buried at the Kalevankangas Cemetery.

Family 
Ida Vihuri's sister was the politician Kaisa Hiilelä who was a Member of the Parliament in 1930–1958. Their nephew was the Minister of Education Reino Oittinen.

References

External links 
Ida Vihuri Parliament of Finland. (in Finnish)

1882 births
1929 deaths
People from Lempäälä
Social Democratic Party of Finland politicians
Members of the Parliament of Finland (1922–24)
Members of the Parliament of Finland (1924–27)
Members of the Parliament of Finland (1927–29)
Members of the Parliament of Finland (1929–30)
Women members of the Parliament of Finland
Finnish trade unionists
Women trade unionists
People of the Finnish Civil War (Red side)
Deaths due to shipwreck